Dorcadion bouilloni is a species of beetle in the family Cerambycidae. It was described by Breuning and Ruspoli and 1975.

References

bouilloni
Beetles described in 1975